Hopedale is a village in Tazewell County, Illinois, United States. The population was 865 at the 2010 census. It is part of the Peoria, Illinois Metropolitan Statistical Area. The town is also home to a small number of restaurants, general stores, parks, and the Hopedale Medical Complex.

Geography
Hopedale is located at  (40.422265, -89.417799).

Demographics

As of the census of 2000, there were 929 people, 322 households, and 228 families residing in the village. The racial makeup of the village was 99.78% White, and 0.22% from two or more races. Hispanic or Latino of any race were 0.11% of the population.

There were 322 households, out of which 30.7% had children under the age of 18 living with them, 60.2% were married couples living together, 6.8% had a female householder with no husband present, and 28.9% were non-families. 24.2% of all households were made up of individuals, and 12.1% had someone living alone who was 65 years of age or older. The average household size was 2.52 and the average family size was 3.01.

In the village, the population was spread out, with 21.1% under the age of 18, 7.6% from 18 to 24, 24.1% from 25 to 44, 17.2% from 45 to 64, and 29.9% who were 65 years of age or older. The median age was 42 years. For every 100 females, there were 86.2 males. For every 100 females age 18 and over, there were 80.1 males.

The median income for a household in the village was $37,596, and the median income for a family was $42,625. Males had a median income of $37,188 versus $23,750 for females. The per capita income for the village was $17,784. About 3.8% of families and 6.4% of the population were below the poverty line, including 4.6% of those under age 18 and 6.1% of those age 65 or over.

The estimated population in July 2006 is 919, with a decrease of 1.1%.

References

External links
 Hopedale Betterment Association Web Site

Villages in Tazewell County, Illinois
Villages in Illinois
Peoria metropolitan area, Illinois